Eburnean Democratic Bloc (in French: Bloc Démocratique Eburnéen), was a splinter group of the Democratic Party of Côte d'Ivoire (PDCI) formed in 1949. BDE opposed what they saw as the 'submission' of PDCI under the French Communist Party (PCF).

The president of BDE was Etienne Djaument.

References

Defunct political parties in Ivory Coast
Political parties in French West Africa